Harwich & Parkeston Football Club is an English football club based in Harwich, Essex.

History
The club was established in 1877, and reached their first cup final in 1891, losing to Clapton in the final of the Essex Senior Cup. In 1898 they moved to the Royal Oak ground and also reached the final of the FA Amateur Cup, losing 1–0 to Stockton. However, they did win the Essex Senior Cup, beating Leytonstone. The club were founder members of the South East Anglian League in 1903 and were runners-up in its first season. However, they finished bottom of the league the following season. They played in the league until 1910, but also joined the Essex & Suffolk Border League, which they won in 1908–09, 1913–14, 1920–21, 1921–22, 1922–23, 1928–29, 1931–32, 1932–33 and 1933–34.

In 1934–35 the club reached the first round of the FA Cup, but lost 3–0 at Bristol Rovers. In 1935 the club became founder members of the Eastern Counties League, and shared the first championship with Lowestoft Town. The following season they reached the FA Cup first round again, losing 5–1 at Bournemouth & Boscombe Athletic.

In 1937 the club left the Eastern Counties League to play in the Essex County League, which they won at the first attempt, but returned after a single season as the league folded. In 1938 a record attendance of 5,649 was set during the Amateur Cup quarter final match against Romford. They reached the final of the Amateur Cup in 1953, but lost 6–0 to Pegasus at Wembley Stadium in front of a crowd of 100,000. The following season they reached the FA Cup first round again, but lost 3-2 at home to Headington United. The first round was reached again in 1961–62 and 1963–64, but the club suffered heavy defeats on both occasions, losing 5–1 at Torquay United and 8–2 at Crystal Palace.

In 1964 the club joined Division Two of the Athenian League. Champions in their first season, they were promoted to Division One. After finishing runners-up the following season, the club were promoted to the Premier Division. They remained at that level until 1973, when they switched to Division Two of the Isthmian League. With a third-place finish in 1976–77 they were promoted to Division One, also reaching the first round of the FA Cup again, where they lost 3–0 at home to Enfield in a replay after a 0–0 draw. However, they were relegated in 1979–80 and after finishing bottom in 1982–83 the club dropped into the Athenian League for one season, before returning to the Eastern Counties League.

In 2002–03 they were relegated to Division One of the Eastern Counties League, but finished runners-up in their first season to make an immediate return. They remained in the Premier Division until resigning on 9 February 2010, and subsequently joining the Premier Division of the Essex & Suffolk Border League for the 2010–11 season. In 2014 the club disbanded its reserve team, and dropped into Division One of the Border League for the 2014–15 season. Despite only finishing tenth in 2017–18, the club were promoted to the new Division One South of the Eastern Counties League.

Honours
Athenian League
Division Two Champions 1964–65
Eastern Counties League
Champions 1935–36 (joint)
League Cup winners 1936, 1937, 1997
Essex County League
Champions 1937–38
Essex & Suffolk Border League
Senior Division champions 1908–09, 1913–14, 1920–21, 1921–22, 1922–23, 1928–29, 1931–32, 1932–33, 1933–34

Records
Best FA Cup performance: First round, 1934–35, 1936–37, 1953–54, 1961–62, 1963–64, 1976–77
Best FA Trophy performance: Third round, 1975–76
Best FA Vase performance: Quarter-finals, 1990–91

References

External links
Club website

Football clubs in England
Football clubs in Essex
Association football clubs established in 1877
Harwich
Essex and Suffolk Border Football League
Suffolk and Ipswich Football League
Eastern Counties Football League
Essex County League
Isthmian League
Athenian League
1877 establishments in England
North Essex League